Hviezdoslavov (or ) is a village and municipality in the Dunajská Streda District in the Trnava Region of south-west Slovakia.

Geography
The municipality lies at an altitude of 126 metres and covers an area of 10.54 km². It has a population of about 2768 people according to 2021 census.

History
In the 9th century, the territory of Hviezdoslavov became part of the Kingdom of Hungary.In historical records the village was first mentioned in 1921. It was founded in the same year as part of a colonisation program by which Slovak and Czech colonies were set up within the framework of official and private colonisation of areas with ethnic Hungarian majority.

Demography 

Census 2011 : recorded population of the village 612 people. 406 people (66%) are Slovaks, 86 people (14%) Hungarians and 120 (14%) others nationality.

Roman Catholicism is the majority religion of the village, its adherents numbering 66.85% of the total population, while 19.29 per cent of the respondents did not belong to any denomination

See also
 List of municipalities and towns in Slovakia

References

Genealogical resources

The records for genealogical research are available at the state archive "Statny Archiv in Bratislava, Slovakia"

External links
Surnames of living people in Hviezdoslavov

Villages and municipalities in Dunajská Streda District
Hungarian communities in Slovakia